= Khóo Tsú-song old house =

Historical site in Taiwan

Coordinates: 25.1274°N 121.7441°E

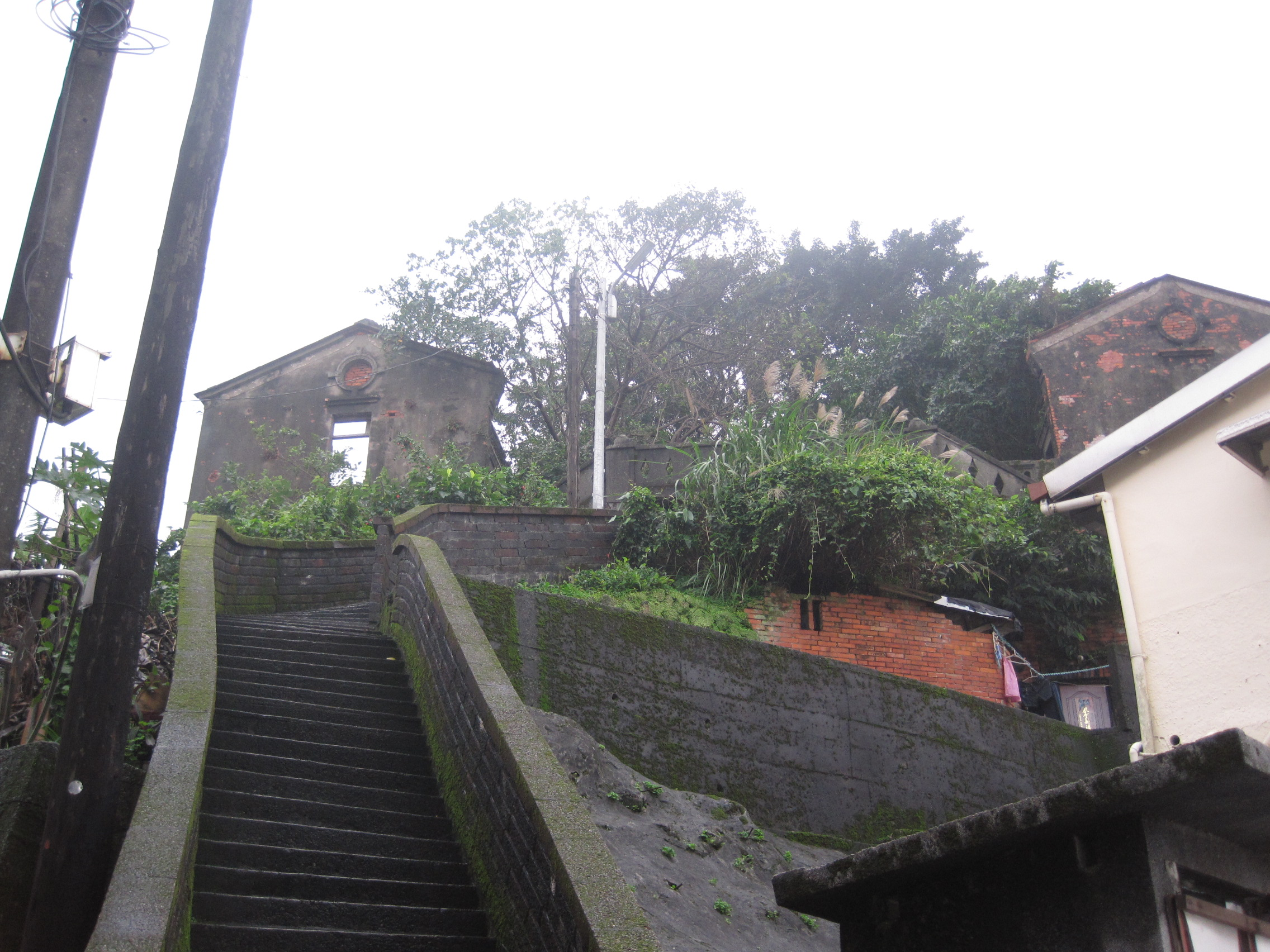
Stairway leading to the Khóo Tsú-song house

The Khóo Tsú-song old house (Chinese: 許梓桑古厝) is a historical site located in Keelung, Taiwan. The place is named after its main owner, Khóo Tsú-song (1874-1945), a Taiwanese notable who has been in charge of Keelung city as well as Taipei province during the Japanese period. Khóo Tsú-song (許梓桑) is his name pronounced in Hokkien, his mother tongue, but he is more well-known today as Hsu Tsu-sun, which is the same name with a pronunciation in Mandarin. Adding to his political responsibilities, he was also a well-known personality in artistic circles, especially connected with poets from all over the country.

His house has been built in 1931. Located very close to what is today the famous Keelung night market, the only streets to reach the house are narrow walking passage transforming into stairways that finally lead to the house, on the top of a hill, with a peculiar view on the rooftops of Keelung city.

Recognized as a historical building since 2001, the place which is partially privately owned, does not benefit from the protection guaranteed by the status of the Historical Site. Currently, the place has been abandoned by its previous owners and has no inhabitants since more than 30 years. Due to disrepair and weathering, the house is now a ruin, and the second floor has no roof anymore. Most of the red brick walls and the windows are still there.

The house is made of several architectural influences. The massive red brick walls remind the fortifications and official buildings erected by Dutch and Spanish colonizers in Damshui and Tainan. The two floors structure could be from the same European style influence, as for the symmetrical two sides stairway leading to the second floor. But once we are on the second floor, the style and the disposition of the rooms, as for the central square are all very typical of the Fukien architecture that we still find all around Taiwan.

In July 2014, an organization called the Keelung Youth Front started to clean the Khóo Tsú-song old house in order to allow the public to be able to visit this architectural patrimony of Keelung city.

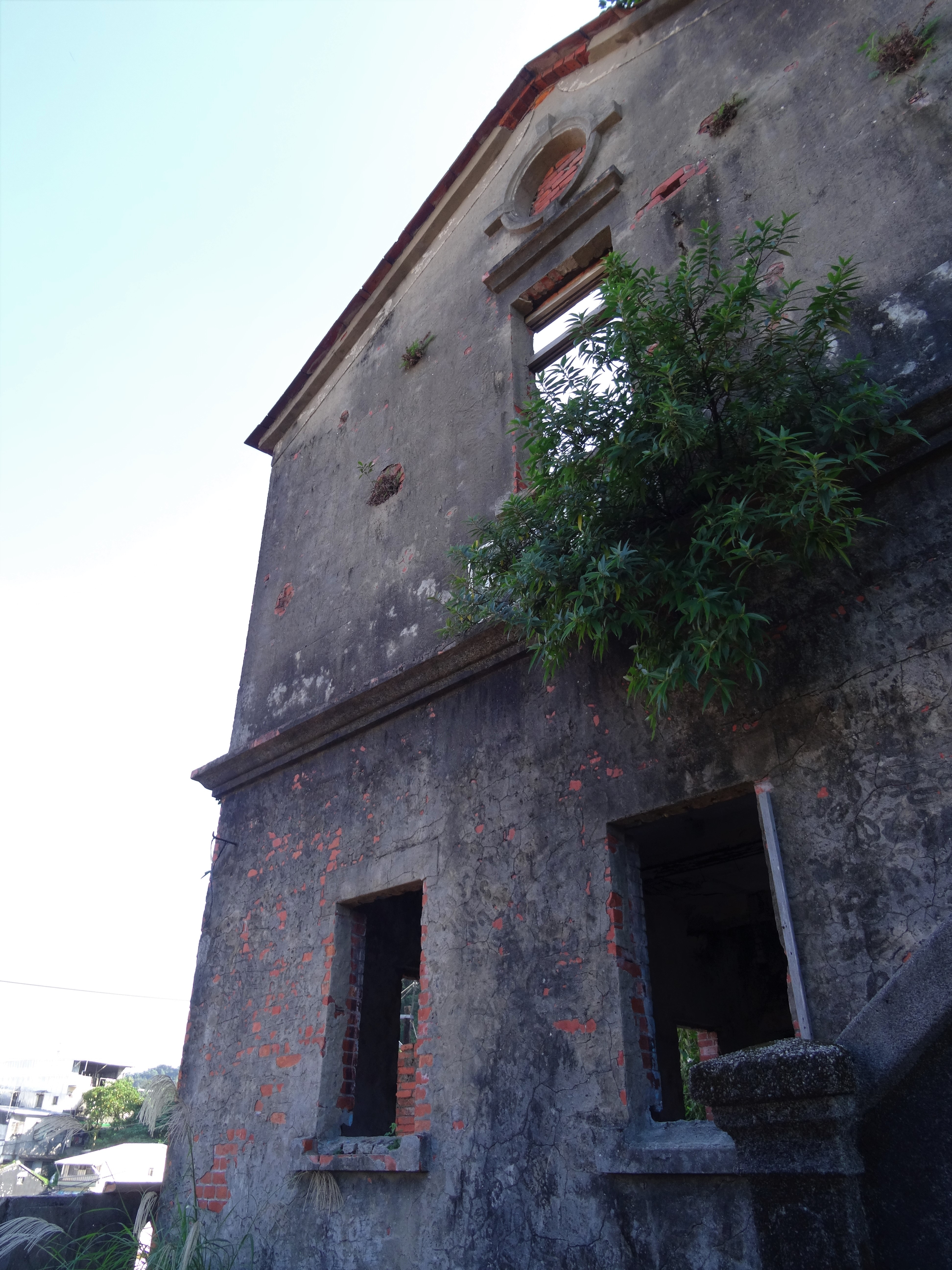

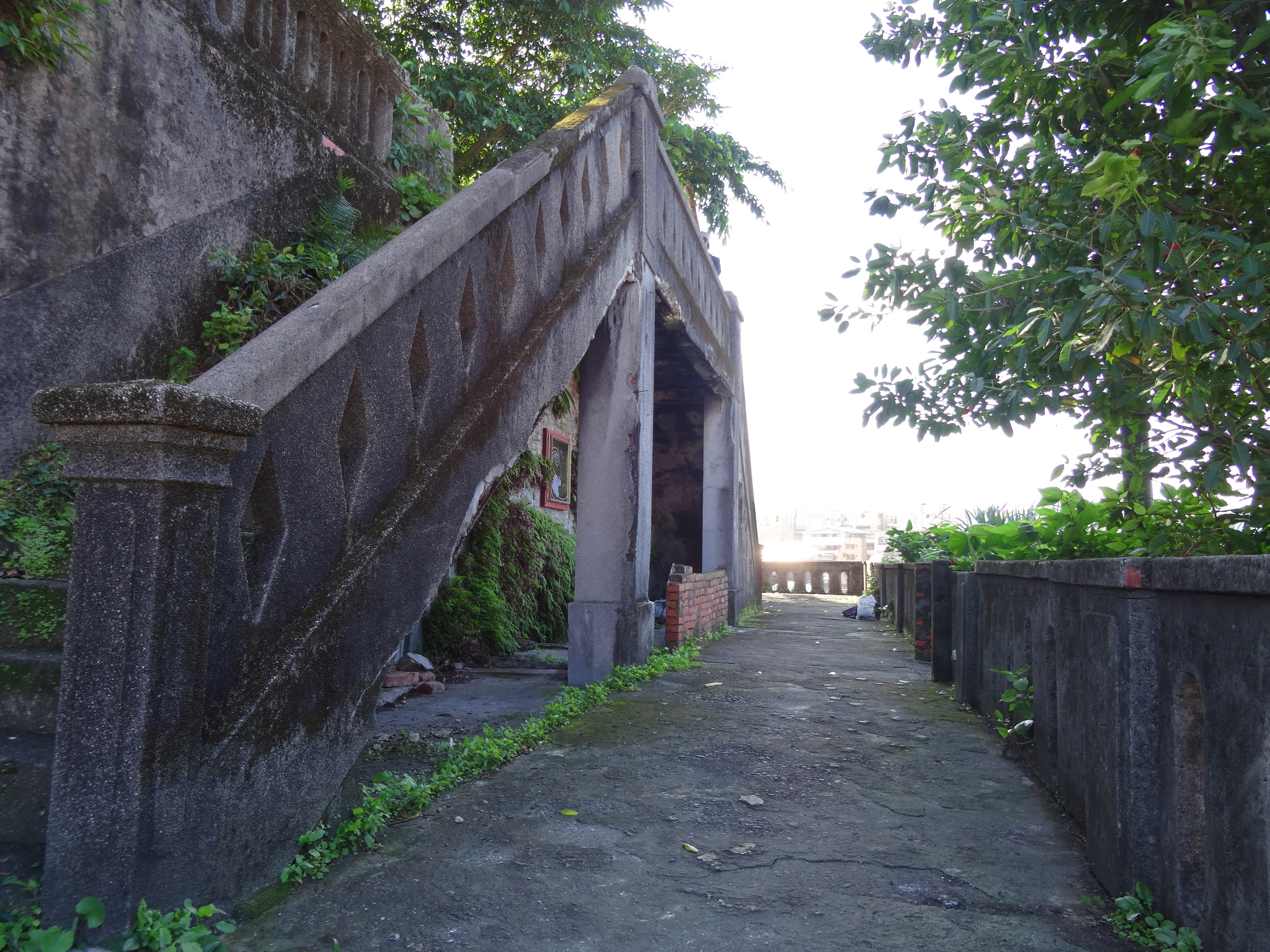
